The 2012 NCAA Division I men's soccer season was the 54th season of NCAA men's college soccer in the United States. The defending champions were the University of North Carolina at Chapel Hill Tar Heels, who defeated sister school, the University of North Carolina at Charlotte 49ers in the previous College Cup championship.

Indiana defeated Georgetown, 1–0, in championship to win the title.

Changes from 2011

Coaching changes

Season overview

Pre-season polls 

Several American soccer outlets posted their own preseason top 25 rankings of what were believed to be the strongest men's collegiate soccer teams entering 2012.

Regular season

Standings

Conference regular season and tournament winners

Statistics 
Regular season statistics only. See 2012 NCAA Division I Men's Soccer Championship#Statistical leaders for the tournament statistics.

Overall 

Top scorers

Last updated on November 13, 2012. Source: NCAA.com – Total GoalsMost assists

Last updated on November 13, 2012. Source: NCAA.com – Total Assists

NCAA tournament

College Cup – Regions Park, Hoover, Alabama

See also 
 College soccer
 2012 in American soccer
 2012 NCAA Division I Men's Soccer Championship

References